YIVO (Yiddish:) is an organization that preserves, studies, and teaches the cultural history of Jewish life throughout Eastern Europe, Germany, and Russia as well as orthography, lexicography, and other studies related to Yiddish. YIVO is now a partner of the Center for Jewish History. Formerly, they had linguists whose main occupation was deciding on grammar rules and new words, and during this time they were seen in the secular world to serve as the recognized language regulator of the Yiddish language. However, YIVO no longer serves this purpose. Nevertheless, the YIVO system is still commonly taught in universities and known as klal shprakh (spelled in Yiddish:כּלל־שפּראַך, meaning 'standard language') and sometimes "YIVO Yiddish" (spelled in Yiddish:ייִוואָ־ייִדיש).

Activities
YIVO preserves manuscripts, rare books, and diaries, and other Yiddish sources.  The YIVO Library in New York contains over 385,000 volumes dating from as early as the 16th century. Approximately 40,000 volumes are in Yiddish, making the YIVO Library the largest collection of Yiddish-language works in the world. The YIVO archives hold over 23,000,000 documents, photographs, recordings, posters, films, and other artifacts. Together, they comprise the world's largest collection of materials related to the history and culture of Central and East European Jewry and the American Jewish immigrant experience.  The archives and library collections include works in twelve major languages, including English, French,  German, Hebrew, Russian, Polish, and Judaeo-Spanish.

YIVO also functions as a publisher of Yiddish-language books and of periodicals including YIVO Bleter (founded 1931), Yedies Fun YIVO (founded 1929), and Yidishe Shprakh (founded 1941). It is also responsible for English-language publications such as the YIVO Annual of Jewish Social Studies (founded 1946).

History
YIVO was initially proposed by Yiddish linguist and writer Nochum Shtif (1879–1933). He characterized his advocacy of Yiddish as "realistic" Zionism, contrasted to the "visionary" Hebraists and the "self-hating" assimilationists who adopted Russian or Polish. Other key founders included philologist Max Weinreich (1894–1969) and historian Elias Tcherikower (1881–1943).

YIVO was founded at a Berlin conference in 1925, but headquartered in Vilna, a city with a large Jewish population in the Second Polish Republic. The early YIVO also had branches in Berlin, Warsaw and New York City. Over the next decade, smaller groups arose in many of the other countries with Ashkenazi populations.

In YIVO's first decades, Tcherikover headed the historical research section, which also included Simon Dubnow, Saul M. Ginsburg, Abraham Menes, and Jacob Shatzky. Leibush Lehrer (1887–1964) headed a section including psychologists and educators Abraham Golomb, H. S. Kasdan, and Abraham Aaron Roback. Jacob Lestschinsky (1876–1966) headed a section of economists and demographers Ben-Adir, Liebmann Hersch, and Moshe Shalit. Weinreich's language and literature section included Judah Leib Cahan, Alexander Harkavy, Judah A. Joffe, Zelig Kalmanovich, Shmuel Niger, Noach Pryłucki, and Zalman Reisen. YIVO also collected and preserved ethnographic materials under the direction of its Ethnographic Committee.  In 1925, YIVO's honorary board of trustees or "Curatorium" consisted of Simon Dubnow, Albert Einstein, Sigmund Freud, Moses Gaster, Edward Sapir and Chaim Zhitlowsky.

From 1934 to 1940, YIVO operated a graduate training program known as the Aspirantur. Named after Zemach Shabad, YIVO's chairman, the program held classes and guided students in conducting original research in the field of Jewish studies. Many of the students' projects were sociological in nature (reflecting the involvement of Max Weinreich) and gathered information on contemporary Jewish life in the Vilna region.

The Nazi advance into Eastern Europe caused YIVO to move its operations to New York City. A second important center, known as the Fundacion IWO, was established in Buenos Aires, Argentina. All four directors of YIVO's research sections were already in the Americas when the war broke out or were able to make their way there. The organization's new headquarters were established in New York City. A portion of the Vilna archives was ransacked by the Nazis and sent to Frankfurt to become the basis of an anti-Semitic department of the Nazis' planned university. In 1946, the U.S. Army recovered these documents and sent them to YIVO in New York.

The YIVO Library was looted by the Germans and the ERR, but an organization that called itself "The Paper Brigade" were able to smuggle out many books and preserve them from destruction. These materials were then saved from the Soviets by a Lithuanian librarian, Antanas Ulpis. These materials are now held in the Lithuanian Central State Archives and Martynas Mažvydas National Library of Lithuania. In 2014, with the cooperation of the government of the Republic of Lithuania, Brent established the landmark Edward Blank YIVO Vilna Online Collections project at The YIVO Institute to preserve and digitize over 1.5 million documents and approximately 12,200 books representing 500 years of Jewish history in Eastern Europe and Russia.

In addition to New York City and Buenos Aires, the Chicago YIVO Society is a third center active today.

Publications
YIVO has undertaken many major scholarly publication projects, the most recent being The YIVO Encyclopedia of Jews in Eastern Europe, published in March 2008 in cooperation with Yale University Press. Under the leadership of editor-in-chief Gershon David Hundert, professor of history and of Jewish Studies at McGill University in Montreal, this unprecedented reference work systematically represents the history and culture of Eastern European Jews from their first settlement in the region to the present day. More than 1,800 alphabetical entries encompass a vast range of topics including religion, folklore, politics, art, music, theater, language and literature, places, organizations, intellectual movements, and important figures. The two-volume set also features more than 1,000 illustrations and 55 maps. With original contributions from an international team of 450 distinguished scholars, the encyclopedia covers the region between Germany and the Ural Mountains, from which more than 2.5 million Jews emigrated to the United States between 1870 and 1920.

See also
Academy of the Hebrew Language, for Hebrew
Autoridad Nasionala del Ladino, for Ladino
Dina Abramowicz (long-time YIVO librarian)
Yiddish Book Center
League for Yiddish

References
Notes

Bibliography
Prager, Leonard, "Yiddish Studies in Israel III", Mendele, Vol. 6.277, April 4, 1997.

Further reading
Dawidowicz, Lucy S. From that Place and Time: A Memoir 1938 - 1947. New York: Norton, 1989. 
 *Fishman, David E. Embers Plucked From The Fire: The Rescue of Jewish Cultural Treasures in Vilna New York: YIVO Institute for Jewish Research, 1996. (in English and Yiddish)
 Kaiser, Menachem. "Paper brigade: The incredible story of the Vilnius archive". The Jewish Quarterly, Winter 2022.

External links 

 
 The YIVO Encyclopedia of Jews in Eastern Europe
 YIVO (Yidisher Visnshaftlekher Institut) – The Yiddish Scientific Institute in the online exhibition The Jerusalem of Lithuania: The Story of the Jewish Community of Vilna by Yad Vashem
 Guide to the Records of the YIVO Aspirantur, 1934-1940
 YIVO Digital Archive on Jewish Life in Poland

Jews and Judaism in Manhattan
Jewish studies research institutes
Publishing companies established in 1925
Bundism in North America
Book publishing companies of the United States
Language regulators
Magazine publishing companies of the United States
Yiddish culture in New York City
Jewish organizations
Archives in the United States
Yiddish
History of YIVO
1925 establishments in Poland
Organizations based in New York City
Jewish organizations based in the United States